The 1933 Saint Mary's Gaels football team was an American football team that represented Saint Mary's College of California during the 1933 college football season.  In their 13th season under head coach Slip Madigan, the Gaels compiled a 6–3–1 record and outscored their opponents by a combined total of 161 to 73.  The Gaels' victories included a 13–6 besting of Fordham, a 22–14 victory over UCLA, and an 18–6 victory over SMU. They lost to California (13–14), USC (7–14), and Oregon (7–13).

Four Gaels received honors on the 1933 All-Pacific Coast football team: halfback George Wilson (AP-1, UP-1); end Fred Canrinus (AP-2, UP-1); tackle Carl Jorgensen (AP-2, UP-1); and guard Ed Gilbert (AP-2).

Schedule

References

Saint Mary's
Saint Mary's Gaels football seasons
Saint Mary's Gaels football